Joshua Castellanos (born November 17, 1995) is an American soccer player.

Career

College
Castellanos played a year of college soccer at the Trinity Baptist College in 2014, before transferring to the University of North Florida where he played for the next three years.

Professional
Castellanos joined National Premier Soccer League side Jacksonville Armada for their 2018 season.

On January 11, 2019, Castellanos signed for USL Championship side El Paso Locomotive ahead of their inaugural season.

References

External links
 El Paso Locomotive bio

1995 births
Living people
American soccer players
Association football midfielders
El Paso Locomotive FC players
Jacksonville Armada FC players
Jacksonville Armada U-23 players
North Florida Ospreys men's soccer players
People from Ponte Vedra Beach, Florida
Soccer players from Florida
USL Championship players